Winchmore Hill is a suburb and electoral ward in the Borough of Enfield, North London, in the N21 postal district.
With the Winchmore Hill conservation area as a focal point, the district is bounded on the east by Green Lanes (the A105 road), Barrowell Green, Firs Lane and Fords Grove, and on the north-west by Grovelands Park; in the south it extends to part of Aldermans Hill, and in the north to Vicars Moor Lane and Houndsden Road.

History
Once a small hamlet in the parish of Edmonton, Winchmore Hill borders Palmers Green, Southgate, Edmonton, and Grange Park.

Prior to the Roman invasion, Hertfordshire, Essex and Middlesex were occupied by the Catuvellauni tribe. It is believed that this tribe built a hill fort on the mound now occupied by Bush Hill Park Golf Club.

The earliest recorded mention of Winchmore Hill is in a deed dated A.D. 1319 in which it is spelt Wynsemerhull. In Old English, 'merhull' translates according to the Concise Oxford Dictionary of English Place Names as 'boundary hill'. It might be speculated that the overall title could mean 'Wynsige's boundary hill'. By 1395 the name had been altered to Wynsmerhull and by 1565 the village was known as Wynsmorehyll, becoming Winchmore Hill by the time it was mentioned in state papers in 1586.

There are many buildings of historical note in Winchmore Hill. The first religious building recorded is the Quaker Meeting House, 1688, rebuilt in 1790. Among those buried here are Luke Howard, the father of modern meteorology, Alice Hum, founder of Palmers Green High School for Girls, and members of the Hoare and Barclay banking families. Samuel Hoare played a prominent role in the campaign against the slave trade.

St Paul's Church was built as a Waterloo church on land donated from the Grovelands estate. The church ceiling was said to be the largest unsupported expanse of plasterwork in Europe until its renovation in the 1960s introduced concealed supports. The original wooden clapboard St Paul's School building can be seen a little further down Church Hill. The remains of the second, brick-and-stone school building are evident in the walls of the church car park. The current 1960s building is on Ringwood Way, off Station Road. Other historical buildings may be seen on Wades Hill, leading north from The Green. On the right, just beyond the shops, are some wooden clapboard cottages; beyond these on the left is a tall five-storey residential building dating back to 1710. This is in the style of the Georgian town houses of London's West End, but stands alone. It once had a partner house to its right, which was demolished by its owners, Keble School (in the days before such buildings were 'listed').

The oldest pub in the district was probably the Green Dragon – on Green Lanes. It is reputed to have opened in 1726 on the junction of Green Lanes and Green Dragon Lane. The Victoria County History reveals that by 1752 The Green Dragon was established, although not in its present form. At that time, highwaymen were hanged near to where they were caught, and it is said that one was caught and executed on a gallows erected by the Green Dragon's front entrance. These gallows were not pulled down for a number of years, which might have prompted the owner to move the pub to its current location at the bottom of Vicars Moor Lane near the end of the eighteenth century. The original Green Dragon was pulled down in 1892 and the new one was extensively remodelled in 1935. It was closed as a public house in 2015 although the building remains as a supermarket. In 2017, a micropub called the Little Green Dragon was opened near to the site of the original eighteenth century Green Dragon at the end of Green Dragon Lane.

The Woodman pub near the end of Broad Walk is reported to have been built in 1727, although there is also evidence to suggest that it dates from 1820. Before the building obtained a pub licence in 1868, it was a private residence.

Woodside House and Rowantree House on The Green at the end of Broad Walk were built in 1750 and of painted brick.

Numerous local buildings that were constructed between 1770 and 1839 remain today. Near the Dog and Duck on Hoppers Road are some old terraced houses built around 1770. Number 106A Vicars Moor Lane is a distinctive private residence that retains the façade of a chapel. To the east on the same road are a number of residences that were probably built around the late eighteenth or early nineteenth century.

In 1865 the Great Northern Railway obtained permission to build a new line to run from Wood Green to Hertford through Palmers Green and Enfield. However, in 1869 financial constraints forced the company to consider Enfield as the northern terminus. Palmers Green and Winchmore Hill were to be the intervening rural stations. The intention was to finish the line to Enfield by 1870, but the terrain was more troublesome than expected and five men met their death while laying the track. The branch opened on All-Fools Day in 1871 and the first passenger train came through Winchmore Hill, creating a new suburb of London. At first only 16 trains a day left Enfield, mostly for Moorgate.

An electric tramway along Green Lanes from Palmers Green was developed in 1907, helping to further develop the area. The tramway is now long gone, but the wide road remains and the 329 bus (formerly the 29, and before that the 123) follows the tram route from Enfield to Turnpike Lane.

The Capitol Cinema, designed in the Art Deco style by Robert Cromie, was opened on 29 December 1929 in Green Lanes, on a site now occupied by the office block Capitol House (demolished by August 2019). Briefly run by Lou Morris, the cinema was taken over in December 1930 by ABC Cinemas, which ran it until its closure on 5 December 1959. It was demolished the following year.

Winchmore Hill today 
At the heart of the area is Winchmore Hill Green, a village green surrounded by shops and restaurants. Winchmore Hill also has its very own "millionaire's row", Broad Walk, that has been home to the rich and famous. Of particular note in Winchmore Hill is Grovelands Park, which was originally a private estate before being partly sold off to the council in 1913. The part remaining in private hands now contains the Priory Clinic, which hosted General Pinochet while he was in the UK awaiting charges from the Spanish government.

Winchmore Hill Sports Club provides the local area with cricket, football, tennis, hockey and table tennis facilities and teams.

Winchmore Hill is located in the Parliamentary constituency of Enfield Southgate.

Demography
At the 2001 census, Winchmore Hill had 12,225 residents in 4,976 households. 80% of residences were owned by their occupiers. The population was in general rather older than in the rest of Enfield – 38.3% being 45 or over, compared with 35.3% for the borough as a whole.

At the 2011 census, 76% of the ward's population of 13,403 was white (54% British, 18% Other, 4% Irish). The area is also covered by the Bush Hill Park ward which had a population of 13,923. In 2011, the ward was 74.3% White (53.1% British, 16.8% Other White and 3.2% Irish)

In the arts 
 Argentinian-born composer Juan María Solare wrote in 2001 a piano piece called Winchmore Hill, dedicated to James MacAonghus (who lives in the district); it was premiered by Dorota Niziol in Stuttgart on 28 September 2002, with a choreography by Diana-Maria Sagvosdkina (Studio für BewegungsChiffren) within the frame of the Kulturmarkt Stuttgart.

Notable residents
 Emma Bunton, singer.
 James Caan, entrepreneur
 Alfredo Campoli, violinist, lived at 48, Eversley Park Road.
 Thomas Carte, historian.
 Alan Dumayne, local historian.
 Thomas Hood, poet.
 Frank Ifield, singer.
 Myleene Klass, singer.
 Norris and Ross McWhirter, born in Winchmore Hill.
 Keith Moon, drummer.
 Louise Redknapp, singer.
 Elizabeth Sawyer, witch.
 Leslie Smith, businessman.
 Rod Stewart, singer.
 Roy Strong, art historian.
 Melanie Sykes, presenter.
 Sharon Turner, historian.
 Leslie R. H. Willis, engineer.
 Paul Young, singer.
 Clem Cattini, drummer.

Schools

Primary 
 St. Paul's School
 Grange Park Primary School
 Highfield Primary School
 Eversley Primary School
 Keble Prep School (Private)

Secondary 
 Highlands School
 Winchmore School
 Ashmole Academy

Independent
Palmers Green High School
Grange Park Preparatory School
Keble Preparatory School

Transport

Railway
Govia Thameslink Railway provide services on the electrified railway line that runs from Hertford North through Winchmore Hill station into London. This line connects further south to the tube system at Finsbury Park, Highbury and Islington, Old Street and Moorgate, where it terminates. The nearest London Underground station is at Southgate, which is on the Piccadilly line.

Buses
Bus routes which serve Winchmore Hill: London Buses routes 125, 329, W8, W9, and night route N29.

Nearby places 
 Southgate
 Grange Park
 Palmers Green
 Enfield Chase
 Cockfosters
 Edmonton
 Oakwood
 Enfield Town
 Bush Hill Park

Bibliography 
 The Cresswells of Winchmore Hill, Peter Hodge.
 A History of Winchmore Hill, S. Delvin.
 Winchmore Hill: Memories of a Lost Village, Henrietta Cresswell.
 Memories of Winchmore Hill, Horace G Regnart.
 Fond Memories of Winchmore Hill, Alan Dumayne, 1990.
 A Look at Old Winchmore Hill, Stuart Devlin.
 Southgate and Winchmore Hill: A Short History, David Pam.
 Dr Cresswell's Winchmore Hill, published by the London Borough of Enfield Libraries.
 The Story of Southgate and Winchmore Hill, Walker Round, Wynchgate Press (1906).

References

External links 
 Winchmore Hill statistics, including map (PDF document, London borough of Enfield, 2004)

 
Places formerly in Middlesex